Huck and Tom is a surviving American comedy-drama film directed by William Desmond Taylor and released in 1918. The scenario by Julia Crawford Ivers is derived from Mark Twain's novels The Adventures of Tom Sawyer (1876) and The Adventures Of Huckleberry Finn (1884). Robert Gordon and Jack Pickford reprise the title roles from the 1917 version of Tom Sawyer, a successful adaptation that was also directed by Taylor.

Plot
As described in a film magazine, while in a graveyard trying an old remedy to get rid of their warts, Tom (Pickford) and Huck (Gordon) witness a murder. At the trial their repetition of the story clears Muff Potter (Bates), an innocent suspect and victim of Injun Joe's (Lanning) plot. Injun Joe escapes to the Painted Cave, where the next day Tom and Becky (Horton) become lost. After a four-day search the missing ones come home and the entrance to the Painted Cave is sealed. Tom tells Judge Thatcher (Burton) that Injun Joe is hiding there. The entrance to the cave is opened and the dead body of the murderer is brought out. Tom and Huck become the possessors of a treasure they found, and with this fortune they plan on becoming great and fierce robbers.

Cast

Reception
Upon its March 1918 release, Huck and Tom received lukewarm reviews. Variety called it "acceptable" and Photoplay described it as "not so fascinating, being an unbelievable mixture of boyish fancy and Brady melodrama."

Like many American films of the time, Huck and Tom was subject to cuts by city and state film censorship boards. For example, the Chicago Board of Censors required cuts of, in Reel 1, the stabbing of a man in the back, robbing the dead man, in Reel 2, a vision of the stabbing of the man, and, in Reel 4, two scenes of Injun Joe prying open a window.

Preservation status
This film is preserved at Archives du Film du CNC, Bois d'Arcy Archive.

References

External links
 
 

1918 films
1910s English-language films
American black-and-white films
Films based on Adventures of Huckleberry Finn
Films based on The Adventures of Tom Sawyer
Films directed by William Desmond Taylor
Films shot in Missouri
1918 comedy-drama films
Films set in the 19th century
American silent feature films
Censored films
1910s American films
Silent American comedy-drama films